The men's 200 metres was an event at the 1996 Summer Olympics in Atlanta, Georgia. There were 78 participating athletes from 57 nations, with eleven qualifying heats (78), five quarterfinal races (40), two semifinals (16) and a final (8). The maximum number of athletes per nation had been set at 3 since the 1930 Olympic Congress. The event was won by Michael Johnson of the United States, the nation's fourth consecutive and 16th overall victory in the event. Frankie Fredericks of Namibia won his second straight silver medal, the eighth man to win multiple medals in the 200 metres. Ato Boldon earned Trinidad and Tobago's first medal in the event with his bronze.

Background

This was the 22nd appearance of the event, which was not held at the first Olympics in 1896 but has been on the program ever since. Four of the eight finalists from the 1992 Games returned: gold medalist Michael Marsh of the United States, silver medalist Frankie Fredericks of Namibia, fourth-place finisher (and 1988 bronze medalist) Robson da Silva of Brazil, and sixth-place finisher John Regis of Great Britain; fifth-place finisher Olapade Adeniken of Nigeria was entered but did not start. Michael Johnson, favored to win in Barcelona before food poisoning resulted in a semifinal exit, also returned.

By the summer of 1996, Pietro Mennea's world record of 19.72 had stood for almost 17 years. Carl Lewis (19.75 in 1983), and Marsh (19.73 in 1992) had come tantalizingly close to it, but eased up. Finally at the Olympic Trials, Johnson knocked .06 off the record. In Atlanta, Johnson (the 1995 World Champion) was the clear favorite and was attempting an unprecedented men's 200/400 double. (Two women had done the double; Valerie Brisco-Hooks in 1984 and Marie-José Pérec just completed her double less than ten minutes before the men's 200 metres final). Johnson occupied the same lane 3 as Pérec had just run in. But, just as in 1992, Fredericks (the 1993 World Champion) had snapped a Johnson winning streak shortly before the Games and could not be disregarded as a challenger.

Aruba, Comoros, Gabon, Guam, Ukraine, and the United Arab Emirates each made their debut in the event. The United States made its 21st appearance, most of any nation, having missed only the boycotted 1980 Games.

Summary

From the gun, Johnson took the lead, quickly making up the stagger on Ivan Garcia to his outside halfway through the turn. Coming on to the straight, Johnson led by a metre from Frankie Fredericks and Ato Boldon, with Jeff Williams fourth. Johnson continued to pull away to the finish and won by over three metres from Fredericks, with Boldon a further metre back. Obadele Thompson closed with a strong straight to edge past Williams at the line another three metres behind Boldon. Three strides past the finish line, while others were still finishing, Johnson looked back to see the clock had stopped at 19.32 and began celebrating. His time was a Beamonesque .4 of a second faster than the world record had been just five weeks earlier, .34 faster than that performance. Far behind him, Fredericks had run 19.68, superior to the old record and Boldon had run 19.80. At that point in time, Fredericks was #2 and Boldon was #7 performer all time.

Competition format

The competition used the four round format introduced in 1920: heats, quarterfinals, semifinals, and a final. The "fastest loser" system introduced in 1960 was used in the heats and quarterfinals.

There were 11 heats of 7 or 8 runners each, with the top 3 men in each advancing to the quarterfinals along with the next 7 fastest overall. The quarterfinals consisted of 5 heats of 8 athletes each; the 3 fastest men in each heat and the next fastest overall advanced to the semifinals. There were 2 semifinals, each with 8 runners. The top 4 athletes in each semifinal advanced. The final had 8 runners. The races were run on a 400 metre track.

Records

These were the standing world and Olympic records (in seconds) prior to the 1996 Summer Olympics.

In the final, Michael Johnson set a new world record with a time of 19.32.

Schedule

All times are Eastern Daylight Time (UTC-4)

The competition returned to a two-day schedule after one Games with three days; now, however, there was no rest day between the two competition days.

Results

Heats

Heat 1

Heat 2

Heat 3

Heat 4

Heat 5

Heat 6

Heat 7

Heat 8

Heat 9

Heat 10

Heat 11

Quarterfinals

Quarterfinal 1

Quarterfinal 2

Quarterfinal 3

Quarterfinal 4

Quarterfinal 5

Semifinals

Semifinal 1

Semifinal 2

Final

Held on August 1, 1996.

References

External links
 Official Report

200 metres
200 metres at the Olympics
Men's events at the 1996 Summer Olympics